Charles Abbot may refer to:

 Charles Abbot, 1st Baron Colchester (1757–1829), British statesman
 Charles Abbot, 2nd Baron Colchester (1798–1867), British politician
 Charles Greeley Abbot (1872–1973), American astrophysicist and astronomer 
 Charles Abbot (botanist) (1761–1817), British botanist and entomologist
 Charles S. Abbot (born 1945), American admiral
 Charles Wheaton Abbot Jr. (1860–1923), American military officer

See also
Charles Abbott (disambiguation)
Abbot (surname)